United Nations Security Council resolution 637, adopted unanimously on 27 July 1989, after recalling Resolution 530 (1983) and Resolution 562 (1985) and numerous General Assembly resolutions, the council commended the desire for peace in Central America noting the Joint Declaration made by the Presidents of Central American nations in 1988 and 1989.

Resolution 637 went on to express its support for the Esquipulas Peace Agreement and the Joint Declarations, calling upon the Presidents to continue their efforts to achieve a firm and lasting peace in Central America. It also appealed to countries with links and interests to the region to support the efforts, including those which support irregular forces and insurrectional movements in the area immediately halt the aid, with the exception of humanitarian aid.

The council also supported the Secretary-General in his efforts and requested him to keep them informed on developments in the situation.

See also
 Contras
 History of Central America
 List of United Nations Security Council Resolutions 601 to 700 (1987–1991)
 United Nations Observer Group in Central America
 United Nations Security Council Resolution 644

References
Text of the Resolution at undocs.org

External links
 

 0637
History of Central America
Politics of Central America
Honduras–Nicaragua border
 0637
 0637
 0637
 0637
July 1989 events